Fun at St. Fanny's is a 1955 British comedy film directed by Maurice Elvey and starring Fred Emney, Cardew Robinson and Vera Day. The film revolves around the teachers and students of St Fanny's private school, particularly the pupil Cardew the Cad who is kept at the school for many years after he should have graduated so that the dishonest headmaster can claim his inheritance. It was based on a radio show which was written by and starred Robinson. The film's sets were designed by art director Norman G. Arnold.

Cast
 Fred Emney as Dr. Septimus Jankers  
 Cardew Robinson as Cardew the Cad 
 Vera Day as Maisie 
 Johnny Brandon as Fanshawe 
 Davy Kaye as Ferdy  
 Freddie Mills as Harry the Scar 
 Gerald Campion as Fatty Gilbert
 Miriam Karlin as Mildred  
 Claude Hulbert as Winkle  
 Kynaston Reeves as McTavish  
 Gabrielle Brune as Matron  
 Stanley Unwin as The Guide 
 Dino Galvani as Pumpernickel  
 Peter Butterworth as The Potter  
 Paul Daneman as Fudge  
 Roger Avon as Horsetrough  
 Ronnie Corbett as Chumleigh 
 Aud Johansen as Praline  
 Tom Gill as Constable  
 Marianne Stone
 Douglas Ives as Museum Attendant 
 Stuart Saunders as Police Sergeant  
 Neil Wilson as Second Museum Attendant  
 Melvyn Hayes as Heckling Boy at Concert  
 Anthony Valentine as Schoolboy in audience

Critical reception
The Standard called it "the British school joke stretched almost to infinity."

References

Bibliography
 Hunter, I.Q & Porter, Laraine. British Comedy Cinema. Routledge, 2012.

External links

Fun at St. Fanny's at BFI Screenonline

1955 films
1955 comedy films
British comedy films
1950s English-language films
Films directed by Maurice Elvey
Films set in England
1950s British films
British black-and-white films